Meenachil Karthas (also known as Njavakkatt Karthas and medackal karthas) were members of an  aristocratic clan, which ruled the small kingdom of Meenachil from 15th century AD until 1754. Unlike the other aristocratic Nair factions of North and Central Travancore who are descended from the Nāgas and the rulers of Travancore and Calicut  with brahminical origin, the Meenachil Karthas were of Rajput origin.

Origin

The Meenachil Karthas were originally Rajputs belonging to royal lineage who migrated to Madurai in the 14th century (the reason for their exodus or their roots in Rajasthan is given as  dynastial disputes & the continuous invasions from the northern regions).
They actually belong to the royal lineage of the rajput dynasty of mewar and the great Maharana Pratap They settled in Madurai (which was a great cultural center and capital city during that time). Later they migrated to Kerala (the reason for which is stated as outbreak of an epidemic in Madurai) and settled in this place "Meenachil" which was named after "Meenakshi" of Madurai.The city of Pala was named after their barracks which were called "padapalayam".Their capital was named Mevada (after Mewar).

Culture and assimilation

In Kerala, they were gradually assimilated into the Illathu Nair caste, which was the major aristocratic caste in Travancore region. As they amassed power, the  title of "Kartha" (meaning Lord in Malayalam) were bestowed upon them by the people. But they retained their original surname "Simhar" (variant of Singh) and their culture remained markedly different from other local ruling clans. Most famous of the rulers were Veera Kerala Damodara Simhar, under whose reign, the principality achieved maximum glory. Differing from the rest rulers of Kerala who had brahminical origin, the Meenachil Karthas follow the rajput traditions and customs. They don't generally wear the sacred thread which is part of brahminical culture, unless an individual choose to learn pooja. They are known for their Rajputi lean physique with the leg proportion greater than the torso and height, with well flexible healthy bodies. They are pure vegetarians by tradition and differing from rest of kerala who are shaivites or vaishnavites, they have "shakti" as their deity
The Meenachil Karthas were also known for their practice of equality among all sects and religions. The Karthas were the rulers who helped the Christians of Kottayam to settle down amidst the protests from other religions. The Pala Old Cathedral is a clear example of this, which was built with the help of the Karthas. And still today when the festival of the Cathedral comes the eldest existing member of the family is involved in with the "udaval" (which is a symbol of power and respect)

The Havoc

Ramayyan started conquering the kingdoms of Central and Northern Travancore one by one during the 18th century and the members of the Meenachil ruling clan was put to face an impending disaster. After breaking the backbone of the Southern Travancore aristocracy by exterminating the most powerful clans such as the Ettuveedans and the members of Venad royal family who identified most strongly with the Illathu Nair nobility (the Thampis), Marthanda Varma under the influence of his Iyer mentor wreaked havoc on smaller principalities such as Thekkumkur, Vadakkumkur, Kayamkulametc., ably supported by his Tamil allies. Many of the ruling dynasties were exterminated within a few days without any trace.

Marthanda Varma's forces invaded Meenachil in 1754. Defying the basic rules of warfare they attacked the meenachil state from behind. As of their rajput tradition they're believed only to be surrendered to valour and not any human and the ruler of the principality did the ultimate sacrifice without surrendering before the backstabbing enemy forces. Almost all the members of the royal family were either killed in the crooked battle or did the ultimate sacrifice.  The ruler for the existence of the dynasty married off two women to the family of Zamorin. At the time of Hyder Ali's invasion of Malabar during 1766,  two young females were alive within the clan. Dharma Raja helped them get married to his family and resettled them. An still today as a compensation to the sin that the erstwhile ruler did to the state, the existing dynasty members receive a fixed amount of money

References

Nair
Social groups of Kerala